The 1972 Los Angeles Rams season was the team's 35th year with the National Football League and the 27th season in Los Angeles. The Rams looked to improve on their 8–5–1 record from 1971 and make the playoffs for the first time since 1969. After a win against the New Orleans Saints at home, the Rams tied the Chicago Bears, 13–13, their third straight season with a tie. This was followed by an embarrassing loss to the Atlanta Falcons, 31–3. However, the Rams would then pick up their winning ways, beating the San Francisco 49ers 31–7 at home, the Philadelphia Eagles 34–3 in Philly, and the Cincinnati Bengals 15–12 at home. However, following this three-game winning streak, the Rams struggled, losing several close games, including an embarrassing 19-16 setback to the woeful New Orleans Saints, as they lost five of their last six to end the season 6–7–1. This was the last time the Rams missed the playoffs until 1981, as they started a dynasty the next season that won the NFC West seven consecutive times, from 1973–1979. They also finished in second place in 1980.

After two seasons as head coach of the Rams, Tommy Prothro was dismissed in late January 1973 and succeeded by Chuck Knox, previously the offensive line coach of the Detroit Lions.

Offseason
On July 13, 1972, Robert Irsay and Willard Keland bought the Los Angeles Rams from the estate of Dan Reeves and transferred ownership to Carroll Rosenbloom, in exchange for ownership of the Baltimore Colts.

NFL Draft

Roster

Regular season

Schedule

Standings

References

Los Angeles Rams
Los Angeles Rams seasons
Los Angeles Rams